Delft Divisional Secretariat is a  Divisional Secretariat  of Jaffna District, of Northern Province, Sri Lanka.

References
 Divisional Secretariats Portal

Divisional Secretariats of Jaffna District
 
Neduntheevu